{{DISPLAYTITLE:C22H28N2O2}}
The molecular formula C22H28N2O2 (molar mass : 352.47 g/mol) may refer to:

 Anileridine, an analgesic
 Betahydroxyfentanyl, an opioid analgesic
 Brefonalol, a beta blocker
 Encainide, an antiarrhythmic drug
 Methoxyacetylfentanyl, an opioid designer drug
 Tebufenozide, an insecticide